Corbichonia is a genus of flowering plant in the family Lophiocarpaceae. Species in the genus are seed-bearing, vascular, succulent-type plants.

References

Caryophyllales genera
Caryophyllales